Clifton Luther Jackson (July 19, 1902 – May 24, 1970) was an American stride pianist.

Career
Jackson was born in Culpeper, Virginia, United States. After playing in Atlantic City, Jackson moved to New York City in 1923, where he played with Lionel Howard's Musical Aces in 1924, and recorded with Bob Fuller and Elmer Snowden. He led his own ensemble, the Krazy Kats, for recordings in 1930, and following this group's dissolution he played extensively as a solo pianist in nightclubs in New York. During this time he also accompanied singers such as Viola McCoy, Lena Wilson, Sara Martin, Martha Copeland, Helen Gross, and Clara Smith. He recorded with Sidney Bechet in 1940-41, and recorded as a soloist or leader in 1944-45, 1961, and 1969. As house pianist at Cafe Society from 1943 until 1951 he was a success; he also toured with Eddie Condon in 1946. He also played with Garvin Bushell (1950), J.C. Higginbotham (1960), and Joe Thomas (1962).

Musical style
As shown by many of his 1944-1945 solo piano recordings, such as "Limehouse Blues", Jackson was one of the most powerful stride piano players. His style was also marked by a contrapuntal-like bass work. His many left hand techniques are found explained in detail in Riccardo Scivales's method, Jazz Piano: The Left Hand (Bedford Hills, New York: Ekay Music, 2005).

Personal life
Jackson was married to the singer Maxine Sullivan from 1950, until his death from heart failure in 1970.

Discography

As leader
 Uptown and Lowdown (Prestige, 1961)
 Carolina Shout! (Black Lion, 1973)
 Cliff Jackson and His Crazy Kats 1930 (Retrieval, 1981)
 Recorded in New York 1926–34 (Jazz Oracle, 2003)

As sideman
 Sidney Bechet, Bechet of New Orleans (RCA Victor, 1965)
 Bunny Berigan, 1935–1936 (Classics, 1993)
 Eddie Condon, The Eddie Condon Concerts (Chiaroscuro, 1972)
 Eddie Condon, The Town Hall Concerts Vol. Four (Jazzology, 1989)
 The Delfonics, La La Means I Love You (Philly Groove, 1968)
 Helen Gross, 1924–1925 (Document, 1988)
 Coleman Hawkins, Years Ago (Prestige, 1964)
 Rosa Henderson, Complete Recorded Works in Chronological Order Vol. 4 (Document, 1995)
 Alberta Hunter, Lucille Hegamin, Victoria Spivey, Songs We Taught Your Mother (Prestige, 1962)
 Lonnie Johnson, Idle Hours (Prestige, 1987)
 Jimmy Rushing, The Jazz Odyssey of Jimmy Rushing (Philips, 1957)
 Al Sears, Things Ain't What They Used to Be (Swingville, 1961) 
 Elmer Snowden, Harlem Banjo (Riverside, 1960)

References

Bibliography
Leonard Feather and Ira Gitler, The Biographical Encyclopedia of Jazz. Oxford University Press, 1999, p. 345.

1902 births
1970 deaths
American jazz pianists
American male pianists
People from Culpeper, Virginia
20th-century American pianists
Jazz musicians from Virginia
20th-century American male musicians
American male jazz musicians
Black Lion Records artists